Diphucrania is a genus of beetles in the family Buprestidae, containing the following species:

 Diphucrania aberrans (Barker, 2001)
 Diphucrania acuducta (Kirby, 1837)
 Diphucrania adusta (Barker, 2001)
 Diphucrania aenea (Barker, 2007)
 Diphucrania aenigma (Barker, 2007)
 Diphucrania aeruginosa (Barker, 2007)
 Diphucrania albertisii (Gestro, 1877)
 Diphucrania albosparsa (Gory & Laporte, 1839)
 Diphucrania aquilonia (Bellamy, 1991)
 Diphucrania armstrongi (Barker, 2001)
 Diphucrania augustgoerlingi (Barker, 2001)
 Diphucrania aurocyanea (Carter, 1934)
 Diphucrania bedfordi (Obenberger, 1935)
 Diphucrania bilyi (Barker, 2007)
 Diphucrania borealis (Barker, 2007)
 Diphucrania brooksi (Barker, 2001)
 Diphucrania broomensis (Barker, 2001)
 Diphucrania browni (Carter, 1934)
 Diphucrania carterellus (Obenberger, 1934)
 Diphucrania carteri (Obenberger, 1924)
 Diphucrania chalcophora (Barker, 2001)
 Diphucrania chlorata (Barker, 2007)
 Diphucrania clermonti (Théry, 1945)
 Diphucrania corpulenta (Barker, 2001)
 Diphucrania cupreata (Barker, 2007)
 Diphucrania cupreicollis (Hope, 1846)
 Diphucrania cupreola (Barker, 2001)
 Diphucrania cupripennis (Guérin-Méneville, 1830)
 Diphucrania cyanea (Barker, 2001)
 Diphucrania cyaneopyga (Carter, 1923)
 Diphucrania cyanura (Kerremans, 1898)
 Diphucrania derbyensis (Barker, 2001)
 Diphucrania duodecimmaculata (Fabricius, 1801)
 Diphucrania elliptica (Carter, 1923)
 Diphucrania elongatula (Blackburn, 1888)
 Diphucrania ernestadamsi (Barker, 1999)
 Diphucrania erythrocephala (Barker, 2007)
 Diphucrania excelsior (Barker, 2001)
 Diphucrania fascigera (Obenberger, 1919)
 Diphucrania fraternus (Kerremans, 1900)
 Diphucrania fritilla (Barker, 2007)
 Diphucrania frontalis (Kerremans, 1898)
 Diphucrania fulgidicollis (Macleay, 1888)
 Diphucrania furfurosa (Barker, 2007)
 Diphucrania gibbera (Carter, 1937)
 Diphucrania goldingi (Barker, 2007)
 Diphucrania gouldii (Hope, 1846)
 Diphucrania guttata (Barker, 2007)
 Diphucrania heroni (Carter, 1934)
 Diphucrania impressicollis (Macleay, 1872)
 Diphucrania inops (Kerremans, 1898)
 Diphucrania kohouti (Barker, 2001)
 Diphucrania laticollis (Carter, 1923)
 Diphucrania leai (Barker, 2007)
 Diphucrania leucosticta (Kirby, 1818)
 Diphucrania macmillani (Barker, 2001)
 Diphucrania macqueeni (Barker, 2001)
 Diphucrania maculata (Gory & Laporte, 1839)
 Diphucrania marmorata (Gory & Laporte, 1839)
 Diphucrania minuta (Barker, 2007)
 Diphucrania minutissima (Thomson, 1879)
 Diphucrania miyama (Barker, 2007)
 Diphucrania modesta (Kerremans, 1898)
 Diphucrania montana (Barker, 2007)
 Diphucrania myallae (Carter, 1934)
 Diphucrania nigripennis (Macleay, 1888)
 Diphucrania nigrita (Kerremans, 1898)
 Diphucrania nigromaculata (Kerremans, 1895)
 Diphucrania nitidiventris (Carter, 1934)
 Diphucrania niveosparsa (Carter, 1927)
 Diphucrania notulata (Germar, 1848)
 Diphucrania nubeculosa (Germar, 1848)
 Diphucrania oblonga (Kerremans, 1903)
 Diphucrania obscura (Blackburn, 1887)
 Diphucrania opima (Thomson, 1879)
 Diphucrania ovalis (Carter, 1923)
 Diphucrania parva (Blackburn, 1887)
 Diphucrania patricia (Carter, 1935)
 Diphucrania pauperula (Kerremans, 1898)
 Diphucrania prasina (Carter, 1923)
 Diphucrania puella (Kerremans, 1898)
 Diphucrania pulchella (Carter, 1923)
 Diphucrania pulleni (Barker, 2001)
 Diphucrania regalis (Thomson, 1879)
 Diphucrania robertfisheri (Barker, 1999)
 Diphucrania roseocuprea (Hope, 1846)
 Diphucrania rubicunda (Kerremans, 1898)
 Diphucrania rubricata (Barker, 2007)
 Diphucrania rubriceps (Barker, 2007)
 Diphucrania scabiosa (Boisduval, 1835)
 Diphucrania scabrosula (Kerremans, 1898)
 Diphucrania semiobscura (Kerremans, 1898)
 Diphucrania sexnotata (Fauvel, 1891)
 Diphucrania speciosa (Barker, 2001)
 Diphucrania stellata (Barker, 2001)
 Diphucrania stigmata Gory & Laport, 1839
 Diphucrania storeyi (Barker, 2007)
 Diphucrania subbifascialis (Carter, 1927)
 Diphucrania suehasenpuschae (Barker, 2007)
 Diphucrania tasmanica (Kerremans, 1898)
 Diphucrania trimentula (Barker, 2001)
 Diphucrania tyleri (Barker, 2007)
 Diphucrania tyrrhena (Carter, 1923)
 Diphucrania ustulata (Barker, 2007)
 Diphucrania vicina (Kerremans, 1898)
 Diphucrania violacea (Kerremans, 1903)
 Diphucrania viridiceps (Kerremans, 1898)
 Diphucrania viridipurpurea (Carter, 1924)
 Diphucrania wagneri (Barker, 2007)
 Diphucrania watkinsi (Barker, 2001)
 Diphucrania westwoodii (Gory & Laporte, 1839)
 Diphucrania williamsi (Barker, 2007)
 Diphucrania wilsonensis (Barker, 2007)

References

Buprestidae genera